Socialist Alternative (Malay: Sosialis Alternatif) (CWI Malaysia) is a socialist group in Malaysia which describes itself as campaigning to bring socialist change in Malaysia and internationally to create a democratic society organized to meet the needs and desires of all. They publish a Malaysian language newspaper called Solidariti Pekerja. They have branches in Kuala Lumpur and Nilai and members from all three ethnic groups - Malays, Indians (Tamils) and Chinese.

It is affiliated internationally with the Committee for a Workers' International (CWI),  an international socialist organization headquartered in London, United Kingdom. As an affiliate it is often referred to as CWI Malaysia.

History
It was founded by Ravichandren who had been a member of Socialist Party of Malaysia (PSM) but adopted the ideas of the CWI while living in the UK . On his return to Malaysia he was asked by the leadership of the PSM to choose between the two organisations and so set about forming a section of the CWI.

Political views

They believe an independent working class political entity is needed to represent the aspirations and needs of the working class. But to oppose the government is not enough; a programme of demands and a clear strategy to achieve them should also be established. The Socialist Alternative spokesman Yuva Balan explained a key text in Marxist thought by Friedrich Engels The Origin of the Family, Private Property and the State in a radio discussion.

Relations with the Socialist Party of Malaysia
They appear to have a good relationship with the PSM who invited speakers from Committee for a Workers' International to speak at their conference in 2005. The complement was returned in 2006 when V.Selvam, a Central Committee member and founding member of PSM was invited to speak at the conference of Socialist Alternative's sister party in Australia. In 2011 Socialist Alternative took part in a campaign to defend PSM when 30 of its supporters were arrested for "reviving the ‘communism’ of the Malayan Communist Party". A review of Michael Jeyakumar Devaraj’s “Malaysia at the Crossroads, a Socialist Perspective” by Peter Taaffe explains some of the differences between the two groups. In an interview with The KL Review  the subject of relationships again came up and their spokesperson Yuva Balan emphasised that debate was not intended to discredit any party but to focus on a strategy to defeat capitalism. They continued the debate in a radio broadcast discussing Karl Marx in a Malaysian context

Activity
They were invited to speak at the Youth Symposium of The Festival of Science on youth movements in the 21st century.

References

2008 establishments in Malaysia
Political parties established in 2008
Malaysia
Socialist parties in Malaysia